Catasetum deltoideum, the triangular catasetum, is a species of orchid found from Guyana, French Guiana, Suriname and Brazil.

Description
This medium-sized orchid is epiphytic in forest at higher elevations. 

It has oblong-fusiform stems (pseudobulbs) carrying deciduous, ridged, many nerved, oblong-lanceolate, acute leaves. The leaves 4–5. Inflorescence arching to horizontal, 8-10 flowered. Male flowers resupinate, triangular. sepals and petals are lanceolate, dark green marked with maroon. lip also triangular, white. Female flowers green. sepals and petals recurved.

References

deltoideum